The oral history of the Iban has traditionally been committed to memory in the oral forms of literature i.e. inchantations (timang or pengap) and genealogies (tusut), and some of these are recorded in a system of writing on boards (papan turai) as pneumonics by the initiated shamans, or lemambang. This includes elaborate genealogical records, which usually go back about fifteen generations, although some purport to go back up to twenty-five. These genealogies (tusuts) are essentially records of who married who and whom begat whom. Names of individuals with great achievements in life are accompanied by a short description, a praise-name (ensumbar) and the respective narratives of their accomplishments. So, this is how the Iban records their history in the oral form.

Some of the songs of the Iban people's oral history (such as the ritual pengap chant, sung during festivals) are mythological or historical accounts composing of key events, major milestones or famous names.

Pre-colonisation

According to oral histories, the Iban arrived in western Sarawak from Indonesia about 1675. There are three groups of Iban i.e. the original Bejie group who was the first Ibans in Borneo, the People of Panggau and Gelong who migrated from Java and the Raja Durong group originating from Sumatra, whom becomes the People of Tansang Kenyalang under Sengalang Burong. Prior to these secondary migrations, there were two more groups arriving at Borneo during the first migrations to the Borneo Island i.e. the Sebungkok group at Tanjung Datu (Melano Cape) and the group at the Merudu Hill near Brunei. These two groups arrived at about the same time with the arrival of the Bejie group at Ketapang. After initial phase of colonising and settling the river valleys, displacing or absorbing the local populations of Bukitans and Serus, there began a period of total war both inter-tribal and inter-tribal in nature.

Local leaders were forced to resist the tax collectors of the Malay sultans (Brunei).

At the same time, the Iban started to be culturally influenced by the Malay, and Iban leaders begin to be known by Malay titles such as Orang Kaya and Panglima. Several of the Malays active on the river-estuaries, such as Indra Lela, Sharif Japar and Sharif Sahap, claimed to be descendants of the prophet. Sharif Ahmit was killed by the Iban.

The Bajau and Illanun, arrived from the Philippines in galleys plundered in Borneo, and were fought by the Iban. Oral tradition recounts such a fight by Unggang "Lebor Menoa" from Entanak near modern Betong.

According to tradition, Unggang or Sunggang "Lebor Menoa" encountered Chinese traders who came in ships to the Saribas in order to sell cooking pots, brass pots, pottery bowls, shell armlets and cowry shells for padi.

During that time, the Ibans were also engaged in conflict with the Orang Ulu of northern Sarawak, the Bidayuh of southern Sarawak, the Kantu and other Indonesian ethnic tribes from eastern Sarawak; the Iban successfully controlled the western coastline of Sarawak.

The start of enmity between Sebuyau, Balau and Undup Ibans against Saribas and Skrang Ibans can be traced back to the incitements by the Malays who collected taxes on behalf of the Brunei Sultanate.

The Malay leader Indra Lela, brother of Lela Wangsa of Lingga and Lela Pelawan, incited the Saribas and Skrang Ibans to war against the Sebuyau Dayaks in order to control them.

Undoubtedly, the Malays did encourage Iban warfare, among Ibans themselves (intratribal war) and against Malay-ruled peoples who evaded contribution (intertribal war).

The Saribas were led by Orang Kaya Pemancha Dana "Bayang" of Padeh, in alliance with Linggir "Mali Lebu" who was the son of Uyut "Bedilang Besi" of Paku, Bunyau Apai Bakir of Entanak and Unal "Bulan" of Ulu Layar.

The Skrang were led by Libau "Rentap", Orang Kaya Gasing and Orang Kaya Rabong. Rentap was later conferred the title of Raja Ulu (Upriver King) by his followers while fighting Rajah Brooke at Mount Sadok and was famous for his battle cry of "AGI IDUP AGI NGELABAN" meaning "STILL ALIVE, STILL FIGHTING".

The Sebuyau Dayaks were led by their chief Ngelambong and later his son Temenggong Jugah of Lundu.

The outbreak of intratribal warfare coincided roughly with the beginnings of friction with Brunei and contacts with the Illanuns and other sea raiders. However, even prior to this, there had been fighting on several occasions, one of which is the story of Beti (Brauh Ngumbang) of Skrang and his quarrel with the Sebuyau warrior named Chagik who had unsuccessfully courted Riti who became Beti's seventh wife.

Two more occasions that led to the intra-tribal wars involved men from the Saribas who had become involved in quarrels in their own home rivers fled to the Sebuyau settlements. They subsequently involved the Sebuyau people in the dispute with the Saribas Ibans.

The first occasion was between two friends by the name of Brayun versus Janang over a lady known as Bremas, in the Ulu Samu during the chieftain of Saing, the son of Tuah. Brayun slashed one of Janang's ears who then fled to Sebuyau and returned with some Sebuyau people to attack Brayun's house.

Another incident of the Saribas-Sebuyau hostility took place as a result of a quarrel over a tapang tree which was a source of honey at a small Bangkit stream that lies between the Paku and Rimbas rivers in Saribas. There were two longhouses here, one under the leadership of Anal and Sana and the other under Senabong who claimed ownership of the same tapang tree.

Both sides agreed to settle the dispute over a diving (kelam ai) contest which Sana and Anal claimed that Senabong had lost but he disagreed. Senabong people then migrated to Telong Semerang from which they first sent a war party back to their old home to fight against Sana and Anal.

After they had migrated to Sebuyau, Senabong’s men again raided Bangkit but this time with the assistance of the Sebuyau people. By now, Sana and Anal were so worried by these attacks that they humbly invited Gerijih (Ai Marang) of Paku to come and live with them in Bangkit. After many more adventures, Gerijih finally defeated Senabong and took his head.

Further clash between the Sebuyau and the people of Saribas took place in the time of Luta who was the son of Unggang (Lebur Menua) of Entanak. According to Saribas oral history, the Sebuyau Dayaks themselves murdered Luta’s brother named Ngadan. It should be remembered that more Sebuyau Dayaks lived at other areas in Sarawak including Lundu and Samarahan.

In retaliation for this incident, Luta led the Saribas people to raid Sebuyau where he killed many of the enemies. After the missing of Luta and his brothers Mulok and Ketit in search of the valuable tuchong shell armlet off Cape Datu, the leadership in the Saribas was passed from his family at Entanak to that of Orang Kaya Pemancha Dana (Bayang) of the Padeh tributary.

While chief Nyanggau and his followers living in his longhouse at Lemas in the Undup river, they were attacked and defeated by Indra Lela and his forces from the Skrang. Due to this defeat, Nyanggau and his people fled away to settle at Dau, in Indonesian Borneo.

About 1834, the Skrang led by Orang Kaya Rabong made a raid on Banting Hill, which was inhabited by Balau Dayaks and Malays, who suffered heavy losses. Before the fight, one Balau shaman (medicine man) by the name of Manang Langgong announced loudly that Indra Lela was the instigator for the quarrel between them as follows:

“Why are we fighting? We have no quarrel with each other. It is all the fault of Indra Lela who has been playing a double game!” shouted Langgong.

When Indra Lela heard this, he jumped into the Lingga River to escape being beheaded by the Dayaks. According to a story, he turned into a crocodile, which for years afterwards caught unwary people swimming and bathing in the region.

However, despite this, the battle continued and the Banting Malays and Balau Dayaks were badly defeated. It was during this attack that Chulo (Tarang) a leading warrior of Linggir (Mali Lebu) made his praise-name or ensumbar "Tarang".

Three years later in 1837, Orang Kaya Pemancha Dana made war on the Undup Ibans who had killed his brother Angkum and utterly defeated them, taking many captives and looting a famous guchi jar that was thought to have magical properties. This war was famously called "Bala Besai" (Great Force) because all people from Skrang and Saribas joined the war or "Ngayau Lus" (Extinct War) because the great force attacked not only one longhouse but all longhouses in the Undup to finish them off.

The surviving Undup Ibans took refuge in the Kapuas valley and Lingga and later settled in the area of Salimbau. Only under the rule of Brooke did they return to Banting hill, which had meanwhile been settled by the Skrang.

In retaliation, the Sebuyau Sea Dayaks under Orang Kaya Temenggong Jugah Anak Ngelambong of Lundu attacked Paku on the Saribas at about the time. He attacked Adir's longhouse at Matop but most inhabitants had fled earlier.

Ca. 1838, the Balau Sea Dayaks raided the Saribas and Kalaka (Krian) which is a place east of the Saribas under the leadership of Ijau "Lang" and his son-in-law Orang Kaya Janting to avenge their previous losses at Banting and revenge for their disturbed peace and harmonious lives. However, Ijau "Lang" was defeated by Unal "Bulan" at the Plassan stream in Saribas while Janting defeated the large longhouse of Orang Kaya Temenggong Tandok at the Melupa stream in Kalaka.

Early in 1839 in revenge for the defeat of his father-in-law Ijau "Lang", Janting and all his bravest warriors of Banting set out to fight the Saribas. They had decided to attack both the Paku and Rimbas tributaries in the Saribas. The combined Rimbas and Paku defenders agreed to fight the attackers in the Rimbas tributary at Nanga Undai stream on the night of the next full moon.

However, the Rimbas force came earlier than the Paku force but later than the Balau force who attacked them and capsized their smaller boats straightaway. Many of the Rimbas Ibans were killed including the sons of Orang Kaya Antau and Gun who had come with the war party.

The battles mentioned above were all between various groups of Ibans who lived at the mouths of different rivers. This intermittent struggle continued after 1839. It was because of these that the newly arrived James Brooke found that he could easily get the support of the Sebuyau, Undup and Balau Dayaks in his warfare against the Saribas and Skrang and later on against the Kanowit and Ulu Rajang.
The quarrel and war between the upper and downriver of Batang Ai resulted in the migration back to Batang Kanyau from which the Iban crossed over to the upper Batang Katibas and proceeded to the upper Batang Baleh, a branch of the Batang Rajang.

Rule by Brooke

The Iban fell under the rule of Rajah James Brooke in 1841. Notably, Brooke was not colonizing or ruling on behalf of the British Empire; he ruled Sarawak as an absolute monarch, unconnected to any imperial power. After defeating the rebellion led by Datu Patinggi Ali in Kuching (then Sarawak proper), James Brooke was appointed the Rajah of Sarawak. His second biggest battle was against the Iban of Saribas and Skrang region led by Linggi "Mali Lebu" at the battle of Beting Maru. After this, James Brooke tried to sign the Saribas Peace Treaty with Orang Kaya Pemancha Dana "Bayang".

Charles Brooke, the second rajah, was committed to ending purported headhunting and piracy on the part of the Iban, and made numerous attempts to quell such activities with military force which is mostly made of local inhabitants who were exempted from paying local door taxes and could take any heads and other valuable items like jars and brassware. This often led to organized resistance by the Iban. In one instance, the Iban leader Libau (Rentap) resisted Brooke from his fortress on Mount Sadok and only defeated after 3 successive punitive expeditions. The Ibans of Lingga, the Undup Ibans and the Sebuyau fought for Brooke. After Balang "Balai Nyabung" was executed by the Brooke government, his brother Enjop led a rebellion in the Katibas region which was quelled after 3 punitive expeditions. Bantin "Ijau Lelayang was another rebel leader along with Pengulu Ngumbang "Berauh Langit" in the upper Batang Ai. Lintong "Mua Ari" of Kanowit, Kana of Engkari and Kedu "Lang Ngindang" also once rebelled against the Brooke government. Thereafter, the Iban became vital allies of the Brooke dynasty, with the defeat of both Rentap and later the last rebel leader Asun.

Vyner Brooke was the third rajah of Sarawak. He had to quell rebellions by Tabur, Pengulu Merum and Asun of Entabai. He ceded Sarak to the British government after the second World War after winning a mojority vote in the Sarawak State Assembly and local resistance of the secession idea. However, Sir Edward Ardell who was the British governor in Sarawak gave independence to Sarawak on 22 July 1963. Soon Sarawak formed the Federation of Malaysia with Sabah, Malaya and Singapore (which ceded later).

Warfare between Dayak peoples continued to be an intermittent problem for the regime until the Great Peacemaking in Kapit in 1924, when the Rajah Vyner also consolidated the support of the Iban by appointing one of their great war heroes Koh Anak Jubang (1870–1956) to the position of Temenggong or paramount chief. Koh became a member of the advisory council of the state, the Council Negri, and converted to Christianity in 1949. He was awarded the Queen's Medal for Chiefs and the Order of the British Empire.

World War II

During the Japanese occupation of Sarawak from 1942-5 the Iban also played a role in guerilla warfare against the occupying forces, particularly in the Kapit Division where headhunting was temporarily revived towards the end of the war.

At this time Sarawak came under the temporary military administration of the Australian forces, who were particularly prominent in the liberation of Borneo.

Sarawak got its own independence from the British on 22 July 1963 while Sabah got its independence on 31 August 1963.

On 16 September 1963, the Federation of Malaysia was formed between the Federation of Malaya at that time, Sabah (North Borneo), Sarawak and Singapore.

The Cobbold Commission which surveyed Sarawakians about the formation of Malaysia reported a third favours its formation while another third was against it and the remaining third did not form any opinion.

Brunei refused to join the formation of Malaysia and got its independence in 1984 from the British.

Singapore ceded from Malaysia in 1969 to be independent until today.

See also
Iban people

References

History of Malaysia
Iban people